The Thomas–Fermi (TF) model, named after Llewellyn Thomas and Enrico Fermi, is a quantum mechanical theory for the electronic structure of many-body systems developed semiclassically shortly after the introduction of the Schrödinger equation. It stands separate from wave function theory as being formulated in terms of the electronic density alone and as such is viewed as a precursor to modern density functional theory. The Thomas–Fermi model is correct only in the limit of an infinite nuclear charge. Using the approximation for realistic systems yields poor quantitative predictions, even failing to reproduce some general features of the density such as shell structure in atoms and Friedel oscillations in solids. It has, however, found modern applications in many fields through the ability to extract qualitative trends analytically and with the ease at which the model can be solved. The kinetic energy expression of Thomas–Fermi theory is also used as a component in more sophisticated density approximation to the kinetic energy within modern orbital-free density functional theory.

Working independently, Thomas and Fermi used this statistical model in 1927 to approximate the distribution of electrons in an atom. Although electrons are distributed nonuniformly in an atom, an approximation was made that the electrons are distributed uniformly in each small volume element ΔV (i.e. locally) but the electron density  can still vary from one small volume element to the next.

Kinetic energy 
For a small volume element ΔV, and for the atom in its ground state,  we can fill out a  spherical momentum space volume VF  up to the Fermi momentum pF , and thus,

where  is the position vector of a point in ΔV.

The corresponding phase space volume is

The electrons in ΔVph  are distributed uniformly  with two electrons per h3 of this phase space volume, where h is Planck's constant. Then the number of electrons in ΔVph  is

The number of electrons in ΔV  is

where  is the electron number density.

Equating the number of electrons in ΔV  to that in ΔVph  gives,

The fraction of electrons at  that have momentum between p and p+dp is,

where a previous expression relating  to  has been used and,

Integrating the kinetic energy per unit volume  over all space, results in the total kinetic energy of the electrons,

This result shows that the total kinetic energy of the electrons can be expressed in terms of only the spatially varying electron density  according to the Thomas–Fermi model. As such, they were able to calculate the energy of an atom using this expression for the kinetic energy combined with the classical expressions for the nuclear-electron and electron-electron interactions (which can both also be represented in terms of the electron density).

Potential energies 
The potential energy of an atom's electrons, due to the electric attraction of the positively charged nucleus is,

where  is the potential energy of an electron at  that is due to the electric field of the nucleus.

The potential energy of the electrons due to their mutual electric repulsion is,

Total energy 
The total energy of the electrons is the sum of their kinetic and potential energies,

Thomas–Fermi equation
In order to minimize the energy E while keeping the number of electrons constant, we add a Lagrange multiplier term of the form
,
to E.  Letting the variation with respect to n vanish then gives the equation

which must hold wherever  is nonzero.   If we define the total potential  by

then 

If the nucleus is assumed to be a point with charge Ze at the origin, then  and  will both be functions only of the radius , and we can define φ(r) by

where a0 is the Bohr radius.  From using the above equations together with Gauss's law, φ(r) can be seen to satisfy the Thomas–Fermi equation

For chemical potential μ = 0, this is a model of a neutral atom, with an infinite charge cloud where  is everywhere nonzero and the overall charge is zero, while for μ < 0, it is a model of a positive ion, with a finite charge cloud and positive overall charge.  The edge of the cloud is where φ(r)=0.  For μ > 0, it can be interpreted as a model of a compressed atom, so that negative charge is squeezed into a smaller space.  In this case the atom ends at the radius r where dφ/dr = φ/r.

Inaccuracies and improvements 
Although this was an important first step, the Thomas–Fermi equation's accuracy is limited because the resulting expression for the kinetic energy is only approximate, and because the method does not attempt to represent the exchange energy of an atom as a conclusion of the Pauli exclusion principle. A term for the exchange energy was added by Dirac in 1930.

However, the Thomas–Fermi–Dirac theory remained rather inaccurate for most applications. The largest source of error was in the representation of the kinetic energy, followed by the errors in the exchange energy, and due to the complete neglect of electron correlation.

In 1962, Edward Teller showed that Thomas–Fermi theory cannot describe molecular bonding – the energy of any molecule calculated with TF theory is higher than the sum of the energies of the constituent atoms. More generally, the total energy of a molecule decreases when the bond lengths are uniformly increased. This can be overcome by improving the expression for the kinetic energy.

One notable historical improvement to the Thomas–Fermi kinetic energy is the Weizsäcker (1935) correction,

which is the other notable building block of orbital-free density functional theory. The problem with the inaccurate modelling of the kinetic energy in the Thomas–Fermi model, as well as other orbital-free density functionals, is circumvented in Kohn–Sham density functional theory with a fictitious system of non-interacting electrons whose kinetic energy expression is known.

See also
 Thomas–Fermi screening
 Thomas–Fermi approximation for the degeneracy of states

Further reading 

 R. P. Feynman, N. Metropolis, and E. Teller.   "Equations of State of Elements Based on the Generalized Thomas-Fermi Theory".  Physical Review 75, #10 (May 15, 1949), pp. 1561-1573.

References

Atomic physics
Density functional theory